Gernot Erler (born 3 May 1944 in Meißen) is a German politician (SPD) who was member of the Bundestag, the German parliament, from 1987 to 2017.

Early life and education
Erler studied history, Slavic studies and political science in Berlin and Freiburg from 1963 to 1967.

Political career
Erler first became a member of the German Bundestag in the 1987 national elections. Following the 1994 national elections, he joined the SPD parliamentary group's leadership around chairman Rudolf Scharping. From 1994 until 1998, he served as the chairman of the Subcommittee on Disarmament, Arms Control and Non-Proliferation.

In the negotiations to form a coalition government with the Christian Democrats under Chancellor Angela Merkel following the 2005 federal elections, Erler led the SPD delegation in the working group on foreign affairs; his counterpart from the CDU/CSU was Friedbert Pflüger. Under the leadership of minister Frank-Walter Steinmeier, he subsequently served as Minister of State (alongside Günter Gloser) at the Federal Foreign Office from 2005 to 2009. When the SPD returned into the opposition from 2009 until 2013, Erler served as deputy chairman of his parliamentary group, again under Steinmeier's leadership. 
 
From 2014 until 2017, Erler served as the German government's Coordinator for Inter-Societal Cooperation with Russia, Central Asia and the Eastern Partnership Countries at the Federal Foreign Office. From 2015 until 2016, he assumed the position of Special Representative of Germany for the country's chairmanship of the Organization for Security and Co-operation in Europe (OSCE) in 2016, in addition to his other responsibilities.

Other activities
 Development and Peace Foundation (SEF), Member of the Advisory Board
 European Leadership Network (ELN), Member of the Advisory Board
 , Member
 University of Freiburg, Member of the Advisory Board
 German United Services Trade Union (ver.di), Member

Sources

External link

Members of the Bundestag for Baden-Württemberg
Living people
1944 births
People from Meissen
Free University of Berlin alumni
University of Freiburg alumni
Members of the Bundestag 2013–2017
Members of the Bundestag 2009–2013
Members of the Bundestag 2005–2009
Members of the Bundestag 2002–2005
Members of the Bundestag 1998–2002
Members of the Bundestag 1994–1998
Members of the Bundestag for the Social Democratic Party of Germany
Recipients of the Order of Merit of Baden-Württemberg